The McKee Homes Fall Curling Classic is an annual bonspiel on the men's World Curling Tour. It is held annually in October at the Airdrie Curling Club in Airdrie, Alberta. 

The purse for the event is $9,600.

Past champions

References

External links
Event site

World Curling Tour events
Curling in Alberta
Airdrie, Alberta